Moerckiaceae is a family of liverworts in the order Pallaviciniales.  The plants are thallose, typically organized as a thick central costa (midvein), each side with a broad wing of tissue one cell in thickness.  All species are dioicous.

References

Liverwort families
Pallaviciniales